William R. Cunningham was an Irish international footballer who played club football for Ulster.

Cunningham earned four caps for  Ireland - three at the 1892 British Home Championship and one at the 1893 British Home Championship.

External links
NIFG profile

Irish association footballers (before 1923)
Pre-1950 IFA international footballers
Ulster F.C. players
Year of birth missing
Year of death missing
Association football defenders